Witkop is the surname of:

 Bernhard Witkop (1917–2010), German-American chemist
 Milly Witkop (1877–1955), Ukrainian-born anarchist
 Rose Witcop (1890–1932), Ukrainian-born anarchist